The following are the national records in athletics in Indonesia maintained by its national athletics federation: Persatuan Atletik Seluruh Indonesia (PASI).

Outdoor

Key to tables: 

+ = en route to a longer distance

A = affected by altitude

# = not ratified by IAAF

Men

Women

Indoor

Men

Women

Notes

References
General
Indonesian Athletics Records - Outdoor January 2020 updated
Specific

External links
 PASI web site

Indonesia
Records
Athletics
Athletics